MedicAnimal is a London-based online pet healthcare retailer.

History 
MedicAnimal is part of the Kokoba group - a privately owned pet food and pet supplies online retailer based in Clerkenwell, London. MedicAnimal was founded in 2007 by veterinarian Andrew Bucher and ex-Goldman Sachs broker Ivan Retzignac. It was a latecomer to the market but acquired three of its competitors in the UK between 2010 and 2012 including Pet Supermarket and Petmeds. In 2019 the company was sold to new owners/managers. Currently a £20M revenue business in the next 5 years, Kokoba is going to embark on an ambitious transformation programme to become Europe’s Leading Dog and Cat Wellbeing Business, and will grow the business to over £100M.
As a part of the exciting journey, Kokoba will also undergo a rebranding and will increase the range of services offered to its customers and their pets.

References

External links 
 Official site

2007 establishments in England
Online retailers of the United Kingdom
Companies based in the London Borough of Islington
Retail companies based in London